NFL Blitz 2003 is a video game published by Midway Games for Game Boy Advance, GameCube, PlayStation 2 and Xbox in 2002.

Reception

The game received "average" reviews on all platforms except the Game Boy Advance version, which received "unfavorable" reviews, according to the review aggregation website Metacritic.

It was a runner-up for GameSpots annual "Best Game No One Played on GameCube" award, which went to Sega Soccer Slam.

See also
Madden NFL 2003
NFL 2K3
NFL Fever 2003
NFL GameDay 2003

References

External links
 

2002 video games
NFL Blitz video games
Game Boy Advance games
GameCube games
North America-exclusive video games
PlayStation 2 games
Xbox games
Video games developed in the United States
Multiplayer and single-player video games